Mark James Littlewood (born 28 April 1972) is the director general of the libertarian, free market Institute of Economic Affairs (IEA) think tank. He was formerly the chief press spokesman for the Liberal Democrats and the Pro-Euro Conservative Party and was an advisor to the Conservative Party under Prime Minister David Cameron. Having previously been in favour of deeper European integration, Littlewood later adopted a eurosceptic position and advocated voting Leave in the 2016 referendum on Membership of the European Union.

Early life
Littlewood attended The Forest School in Winnersh in the Borough of Wokingham, then in the county of Berkshire. He studied philosophy, politics and economics at Balliol College, Oxford, from 1990 to 1993, and was President of the UK branch of the Young European Federalists in 1996. His first job was working for the European Movement, and he was campaigns director of Liberty from June 2001 to April 2004. While on sabbatical, he became the chief spokesperson of the campaign group NO2ID.

Career
Littlewood was appointed head of media for the Liberal Democrats in December 2004. He resigned from the Liberal Democrat position in May 2007, after saying that the introduction of proportional representation should not be a deal-breaker when negotiating for Liberal Democrat involvement in a coalition. He was the director of Liberal Vision from 2008 to 2009, a classical liberal group within the Liberal Democrats, before taking up the directorship of the free market think-tank the Institute of Economic Affairs in December 2009. Since taking up this role, Littlewood has appeared several times as a panelist on the BBC's Question Time.

Littlewood has spoken extensively against regulation of tobacco producing multinationals on behalf of the IEA, who receive long-term funding from British American Tobacco, Japan Tobacco International, Imperial Tobacco and from the cigarette manufacturer Philip Morris International. Littlewood was accused of a "clear conflict of interest" by the All Party Parliamentary Group on Smoking and Health, which stated that he "clearly has a pro-tobacco agenda", while Jean King of Cancer Research UK stated that "for any organisation [such as the IEA] to promote a report saying that plain [cigarette] packaging can't and won't work without making clear that the authors are tobacco industry apologists is unacceptable".

In October 2017, Littlewood was listed as the 45th most influential person on the British right by the broadcaster and former Conservative Party candidate Iain Dale, up one place on his position in Dale's 2016 ranking of right-wing figures. He rose to 38th in the 2018 list.

In 2018, Littlewood was recorded telling an undercover reporter that the Institute of Economic Affairs is in the 'Brexit-influencing game', offering potential US donors access to government ministers and civil servant as it raises cash for research to support the free-trade deals demanded by hardline Brexiteers. Littlewood has been further cited by The Guardian to say that he has "absolutely no problem with people who have business interests, us facilitating those" An investigation by Unearthed has come to find out that the IEA has been working with US donors to capitalise on the opportunity presented by Brexit to alter the rules and regulations that determine how products in the UK are being consumed.

References

External links
Article archive at Journalisted

1972 births
Alumni of Balliol College, Oxford
English politicians
Liberal Democrats (UK) officials
Living people
Politicians of the Pro-Euro Conservative Party